Justin Chu Cary is an American actor who stars on Netflix's Black Summer. The series is a prequel to Z Nation.

Early life and career
Justin Chu Cary grew up in Oakland, California, the son of an African-American father and a Chinese-American mother. He went to the University of California, Davis where he competed for track and field and ran the 800M and 4x400M relays after being a 3 sport athlete at Berkeley High School.

After working in theater in Los Angeles, as well as appearing in a few television series, he was cast on the Netflix series Black Summer. He is also a graphic designer and comic book artist.

Filmography

Films

Television

References

External links

1982 births
21st-century American male actors
African-American male actors
American male actors of Chinese descent
American male television actors
Berkeley High School (Berkeley, California) alumni
Living people
Male actors from Oakland, California
University of California, Davis alumni
21st-century African-American people
20th-century African-American people